Sky Tower, SkyTower, Skytower, or Sky Towers may refer to:

Buildings

In Asia
 Higashiyama Sky Tower, Nagoya, Japan
 Marina Sky Towers in Dubai, UAE
 Sky Tower (Abu Dhabi) in Abu Dhabi, UAE
  in Kowloon, Hong Kong
  in Dubai, UAE
 Sky Tower 41 in Kaminoyama, Japan
 Tiger Sky Tower (formerly Carlsberg Sky Tower) in Singapore
 Tuntex Sky Tower in Kaohsiung, Taiwan
 Tokyo Skytree, Sumida, Tokyo, Japan

In Europe
 Sky Tower (Aarhus), hotel in Aarhus, Denmark
 The Seat of the European Central Bank in Frankfurt, Germany
 Sky Tower (Chișinău) in Moldova
 Sky Tower (Wrocław) in Wrocław, Poland
 Sky Towers (Cluj Napoca) in Romania
 Sky Towers (Kyiv) in Ukraine
 Sky Tower (București), part of the Floreasca City Center complex in Bucharest, Romania
 Sky Office Tower, Zagreb
 The Sky Tower of Tivoli Friheden, amusement attraction in Aarhus, Denmark

In North America
 SeaWorld SkyTower, Orlando, Florida, USA
 Pinnacle One Yonge (under construction), Toronto, Ontario, Canada

In Oceania
 Brisbane Skytower in Brisbane, Australia
 Sky Tower (Auckland) in Auckland, New Zealand

Engineering
 Space tower, a static support compression structure, a tower into space
 Space elevator, a static support tensile structure, a tower from space reaching towards the ground
 Space fountain, an active support structure, towering from the ground towards space

Other
 Carolina Skytower, a ride at Carowinds amusement park, on the border of North and South Carolina, USA
 Skytower Communications Group, a United States radio media company
 Skytower, Inc., a subsidiary of AeroVironment
 SkyTower (radar system), a meteorological system used by some Florida, USA, television stations
 A location in Pokémon Ruby and Sapphire, Pokémon Emerald, and Pokémon Omega Ruby and Alpha Sapphire
 A location in Pokémon Mystery Dungeon: Blue Rescue Team, Red Rescue Team, and Rescue Team DX
 Name of a song from Kirby's Return to Dream Land, later remixed in Kirby and the Rainbow Curse and Kirby: Planet Robobot

See also
 Space Tower, Spanish skyscraper